The Stepford Wives is a 2004 American science fiction black comedy film directed by Frank Oz from a screenplay by Paul Rudnick and starring Nicole Kidman, Matthew Broderick, Bette Midler, Glenn Close, Christopher Walken, and Faith Hill. The second feature-length adaptation of Ira Levin's 1972 novel of the same name following the 1975 film of the same name, it received generally negative reviews from critics and was a box office failure, grossing $103 million worldwide on a $90–100 million budget.

Plot
Successful reality television executive producer Joanna Eberhart's career suddenly ends after a disillusioned reality show participant named Hank attempts a shootout. After Joanna suffers a mental breakdown, she, her husband Walter Kresby, and their two children Pete and Kimberly move from Manhattan to Stepford, a quiet Fairfield County, Connecticut suburb. Upon the family's arrival, Joanna befriends writer and recovering alcoholic Roberta "Bobbie" Markowitz and Roger Bannister, a flamboyant gay man who has moved to town with his long-time partner Jerry.

After the trio witness Sarah Sunderson violently dance and then collapse, Joanna argues with Walter about the incident until Walter bluntly informs her that her children barely know her, their marriage is falling apart, and her domineering nature makes people want to kill her. As he tries to walk out of their marriage, Joanna apologizes and agrees to appease him by trying to fit in with the other wives. The next day, Joanna, Bobbie and Roger go to Sarah's home to check up on her, where upon entering, they hear her upstairs, ecstatically screaming during sex with her husband Herb. As they scramble to sneak out, they find a remote control labeled SARAH, discovering a button that causes Sarah's breasts to enlarge and makes her walk backwards robotically.

One evening, Walter and Bobbie's husband Dave go to the Men's Association with Roger and Jerry, but Joanna and Bobbie hire a babysitter and sneak inside to spy on them and the other husbands. They discover a hall filled with family portraits, but Roger catches them and assures them that all is well. The next day, the pair discover Roger's flamboyant clothing, Playbill program from Hairspray, and photo of Orlando Bloom have all been discarded. Jerry tells them to meet him in the town hall and they see Roger, apparently running for State Senate, with a bland look and conformist personality. Joanna wants to leave and Walter agrees, saying they will go the next day. Going into Walter's study, she discovers that all the Stepford wives were once working women in high-power positions.

The next day, Joanna visits Bobbie, noticing that her formerly messy house is spotless. Now blending in with the other Stepford wives, Bobbie says she is a whole new person and the most important thing is her cookbook. While offering to help Joanna change, Bobbie obliviously puts her hand over the stove's burner. Returning to the Men's Association, Joanna finds that in her family picture she now resembles a Stepford wife. Men's Association leader Mike shows how they insert nanochips into their wives' brains to make them Stepford wives. The men corner Joanna and Walter, force them toward the transformation room, but Joanna asks if the new wives really mean it when they tell their husbands that they love them. The next scene shows the Stepford wives, including Joanna, now blonde and dressed in Sunday dresses, at the grocery store.

With Joanna and Walter as special guests, Stepford hosts a formal ball. During the festivities, Joanna distracts Mike and entices him into the garden, while Walter slips away to the transformation room where he destroys the software that programs the women. At the ball, the wives corner their husbands and reveal that Joanna never received the microchip implant. Mike threatens Walter, but Joanna decapitates him with a candlestick, exposing him as a robot. Mike's wife Claire explains that she created Stepford because she, too, was a bitter career-minded woman. When she discovered Mike's affair with her research assistant, she murdered them in a jealous rage. Claire then electrocutes herself by kissing Mike's severed robotic head.

Six months later, in an interview with Larry King, Joanna (who has won six Emmys for producing the hard-hitting documentary Stepford: The Secret of the Suburbs), Roger (who has won his State Senate seat as an Independent) and Bobbie (who has written and published her first book of poetry Wait Until He's Asleep, Then Cut It Off) explain that the Stepford husbands are being retrained to become better people. The closing scene reveals that the wives have now taken over Stepford and have placed their husbands under house arrest, making them complete the same domestic tasks that they had forced the women to do.

Cast
 Nicole Kidman as Joanna Eberhart
 Matthew Broderick as Walter Kresby
 Bette Midler as Roberta "Bobbie" Markowitz
 Christopher Walken as Mike Wellington
 Glenn Close as Claire Wellington
 Roger Bart as Roger Bannister
 Faith Hill as Sarah Sunderson
 Jon Lovitz as Dave Markowitz
 Matt Malloy as Herb Sunderson
 David Marshall Grant as Jerry Harmon
 Kate Shindle as Beth Peters
 Lorri Bagley as Charmaine Van Sant
 Lisa Lynn Masters as Carol Wainwright
 Robert Stanton as Ted Van Sant 
 Mike White as Hank
 Carrie Preston as Barbara
 KaDee Strickland as Tara
 Larry King as Himself
 Meredith Vieira as host of Balance of Power
 Billy Bush as host of I Can Do Better
 Mary Beth Peil as Helen Devlin

Production
John Cusack and his sister Joan were originally cast as Walter  and Bobbie, respectively, but both had to drop out of the film only weeks before filming started to be with their father Dick, who was dying. Joan had previously appeared in two other films written by Rudnick, Addams Family Values and In & Out (the latter also directed by Frank Oz, for which she was nominated for an Academy Award).

Reportedly, there were problems on-set between Oz and stars Nicole Kidman, Bette Midler, Christopher Walken, Glenn Close and Roger Bart. In a 2003 interview, Oz stated, "Tension on the set? Absolutely! In every movie I do, there's tension. That's the whole point. And working people hard, that's exactly what they expect me to do... Bette has been under a lot of stress lately... She made the mistake of bringing her stress on the set."

The film was originally conceived as a darkly satirical piece with an ending closer to the finale of the original but negative results from test screenings caused Paramount to commission numerous rounds of reshoots which significantly altered the tone of the film and gave it a new ending.

In a 2007 interview with Ain't It Cool News, Oz's take on the film was "I had too much money and I was too responsible and concerned for Paramount. I was too concerned for the producers. And I didn't follow my instincts."

In a 2005 interview Matthew Broderick stated, "Making that film wasn't enjoyable. It was nobody's fault but my part was not terribly interesting... It was not a thrilling film. I would hate it if it were my last."

The majority of the film was shot in Darien, New Canaan and Norwalk, Connecticut.

Reception

Critical reception
On Rotten Tomatoes, The Stepford Wives holds an approval rating of 26% based on 176 reviews, with an average rating of 4.7/10. The website's critical consensus reads, "In exchanging the chilling satire of the original into mindless camp, this remake has itself become Stepford-ized."  Audiences polled by CinemaScore gave the film an average grade of "C+" on an A+ to F scale.

Pete Travers of Rolling Stone said that the on-set complications of the film "can't compare to the mess onscreen." Lisa Schwarzbaum of Entertainment Weekly said, "The remake is, in fact, marooned in a swamp of camp, inconsequentiality." A. O. Scott of The New York Times said, "the movie never lives up to its satiric potential, collapsing at the end into incoherence and wishy-washy, have-it-all sentimentality."

Some critics were more receptive to the film. Roger Ebert called Paul Rudnick's screenplay "rich with zingers" and gave the film three stars. However, in the "Worst Movies of 2004" episode of At the Movies with Ebert and Roeper, he admitted that, while he gave the film a "thumbs up", it wouldn't be "the first movie that [he] would defend."

The film's teaser won several Golden Trailer Awards in the categories of "Summer 2004 Blockbuster" and "Most Original", as well as "Best of Show".

Box office
The U.S. opening weekend's gross was a respectable $21.4 million but sales fell off quickly. That weekend represented over a third of the final domestic gross of $59.5 million. The film also grossed $42.9 million internationally for a worldwide total gross of $103.4 million.

References

External links

 
 
 
 

2004 films
2004 black comedy films
2004 science fiction films
2000s American films
2000s English-language films
2000s feminist films
2000s satirical films
2000s science fiction comedy films
American black comedy films
American feminist comedy films
American robot films
American satirical films
American science fiction comedy films
Android (robot) films
Comedy film remakes
Cyborg films
DreamWorks Pictures films
Films about marriage
Films based on American horror novels
Films based on science fiction novels
Films based on works by Ira Levin
Films directed by Frank Oz
Films produced by Donald De Line
Films produced by Scott Rudin
Films scored by David Arnold
Films set in Connecticut
Films set in Manhattan
Films shot in Connecticut
Films shot in New Jersey
Films shot in New York (state)
Films with screenplays by Paul Rudnick
LGBT-related black comedy films
LGBT-related science fiction films
Mannequins in films
Paramount Pictures films
Remakes of American films
Science fiction film remakes